Antonia Irma Piñeyro Arias (born 26 September 1954) is a Mexican politician from the Revolutionary Institutional Party. She has served as Deputy of the LV, LVIII and LX Legislatures of the Mexican Congress representing Oaxaca.

References

1954 births
Living people
People from Tlaxiaco
Women members of the Chamber of Deputies (Mexico)
New Alliance Party (Mexico) politicians
21st-century Mexican politicians
21st-century Mexican women politicians
Instituto Politécnico Nacional alumni
National Autonomous University of Mexico alumni
20th-century Mexican politicians
20th-century Mexican women politicians
Deputies of the LX Legislature of Mexico
Members of the Chamber of Deputies (Mexico) for Oaxaca